Cerace xanthothrix is a species of moth of the family Tortricidae. It is found in Assam, India, and was first described in 1950 by Alexey Diakonoff.

The wingspan is 33–48 mm. The forewings are blackish violet, suffused with black along the costal area and with narrow streaks of brick-red suffusion. The hindwings are bright orange, but brownish black with a violet gloss and faint yellowish spots posteriorly.

References

Moths described in 1950
Ceracini